Gemini (stylized in all caps) is the second solo studio album by American rapper Macklemore. It was released on September 22, 2017, via Bendo LLC. The first album he released without producer Ryan Lewis since his 2005 solo effort The Language of My World, Gemini is devoid of any political subject matter and just about having a good time. 

The album was supported by three singles, "Glorious", "Marmalade" and "Good Old Days". It received generally positive reviews from critics.

Background
Gemini marks Macklemore's second solo studio album. In an interview with Rolling Stone, Macklemore said of the album: "It's not extremely politically motivated or heavily subject- or concept-oriented. I think it's mostly the music that I wanted to hear. It's the music that I wanted to go get into my car and listen to. I wanted it to be fun." He told Beats 1 radio host Zane Lowe about his new approach for this album: "I always try to get a different palette of sounds and textures and vibes. This album, I was in a good place man. There's some darker songs, for sure, but for the most part, if I'm in a happy place and life is good, that's going to be reflected in the music."

On August 22, 2017, Macklemore unveiled the album's track list and cover art. He released a video teaser of the song "Willy Wonka", a collaboration with Offset, on September 8, 2017. It features behind-the-scenes footage of the recording process.

Singles
"Glorious" was released as the lead single from the album on June 15, 2017. It features a guest appearance from American singer Skylar Grey. Its music video was released on July 6, 2017, in which Macklemore was seen traveling around Modesto, California with his grandmother.

The second single from the album, "Marmalade", was released on July 26, 2017. It features a guest appearance from American rapper Lil Yachty.

The collaboration with American singer-songwriter Kesha, "Good Old Days" was released as a promotional single from the album on September 19, 2017. It was sent to adult contemporary radio October 9, 2017, as the album's third single.

Critical reception

Gemini received positive reviews from music critics. At Metacritic, which assigns a normalized rating out of 100 to reviews from mainstream publications, the album received an average score of 63, based on 8 reviews. Neil Yeung of AllMusic said, "While some fans might prefer Macklemore with Lewis, Gemini is a reminder that before the multi-platinum singles, hit albums, and thrift shop threads, he could handle himself just fine." Jon Dolan of Rolling Stone said, "Macklemore's first post-fame LP minus longtime partner Ryan Lewis finds the Seattle MC unburdened by stardom or the social concern that turns his woke anthems into online firestorms." 

Chuck Arnold of Entertainment Weekly gave note of the unevenness and length through the track listing but commended Macklemore for keeping it together with his personality and giving the project a "loose mixtape quality." Clayton Purdom of The A.V. Club criticized the use of "drop-out catchphrases [and] horn solos and minutes-long American Idol-style belting," along with Macklemore's "earnest neediness" in his delivery, concluding that "the rapper's sentimentality and kitchen-sink production ethos land the record alongside Katy Perry's Witness in the post-Hamilton bargain bin."

Track listing
Credits adapted from Tidal.

Notes
 "Glorious" features background vocals from Adam Aejaye Jackson, Will Wheaton, Oren Waters, Valerie Pinkston, Bridgett Bryant, Niomisha Renee Wilson, Harrison White, and Brenda McClure; and additional vocals from Donna Missal.
 "Firebreather" features background vocals from Grace Love and Tyler Andrews.
 "How to Play the Flute", "Corner Store", and "Excavate" feature background vocals from Tyler Andrews.
 "Church" features additional vocals from Jerome Welch.

Charts

Weekly charts

Year-end charts

Certifications

Gemini Tour

Setlist
 "Ain't Gonna Die Tonight"
 "Firebreather"
 "Marmalade"
 "Thrift Shop"
 "White Walls"
 "Same Love"
 "Donald Trump"
 "Willy Wonka"
 "Drug Dealer"
 "Intentions"
 "Corner Store"
 "Levitate"
 "Dance Off"
 "Can't Hold Us"
 "Good Old Days"
 "Excavate"
 "Downtown"
 "Glorious"

Tour dates

See also 
List of number-one albums of 2017 (Canada)

References

2017 albums
Macklemore albums